Grace Jones (born 1948) is an American model, singer and actress.

Grace Jones may also refer to:
 Grace Jones Morgan (1884—1977), Canadian author.
 Grace Adelaide Jones (1899—2013) and Grace Catherine Jones (1906—2019), British supercentenarians.
 Emily Grace Jones (2013—2020), a murder victim.
 Grace Jones, a novel by Irenosen Okojie.